Albert Cheng may refer to:
 Albert Cheng (politician),  Hong Kong Canadian radio host, businessman and politician
 Albert Cheng (executive), chief operating officer of Amazon Studios